F12 may refer to:

Vehicles 
Aircraft
 Fokker F.XII, a Dutch airliner
 Larson F-12 Baby, an American sport biplane
 Lockheed YF-12, an American prototype interceptor aircraft
 Republic XF-12 Rainbow, an American prototype reconnaissance aircraft

Automobiles (cars and trucks)
 Alpina B6 (F12), a German grand tourer
 BMW 6 Series (F12), a German grand tourer
 DKW F12, a German saloon car
 Farmall F-12, an American tractor
 Ferrari F12 an Italian grand tourer
 Volvo F12, a Swedish truck

Farm tractors
 Farmall F-12, an American tractor

Ships
 , a Leander-class frigate of the Royal Navy
 , a K-class destroyer of the Royal Navy

Other uses 
 F12 (classification), a disability sport classification
 F12 (gene), coding for coagulation factor XII
 F12 Developer Tools, built into Microsoft Internet Explorer and Microsoft Edge
 F 12 Kalmar, a former Swedish Air Force wing
 F12 key, a key on a computer keyboard
 Flat-12, an automobile engine